John Fruhmorgen (born September 28, 1965) was an American football Player in the National Football League for the Miami Dolphins and in The World Football League, London Monarchs.   Fruhmorgen attended and played for the University of Alabama. Raised in Tampa, Florida, he attended Jesuit High School.

Currently is the owner/operator of staffyourdealer.com

John's son, Jake, was a football player for Clemson in 2015 and 2016.  He transferred to Baylor University in 2017.

References

External links
Just Sports Stats

Living people
1965 births
Players of American football from Buffalo, New York
Miami Dolphins players
London Monarchs players
University of Alabama people